Robert Andrew Niven (born 28 April 1948) is an English former cricketer. He played 25 first-class matches for Oxford University Cricket Club between 1968 and 1973.

See also
 List of Oxford University Cricket Club players

References

External links
 
 

1948 births
Living people
English cricketers
Oxford University cricketers
People from Felixstowe
Alumni of New College, Oxford
Hertfordshire cricketers